The Petrograd electoral district was a constituency created for the 1917 Russian Constituent Assembly election. The electoral district covered the Petrograd Governorate, except for the capital city itself.

According to U.S. historian Oliver Henry Radkey the result available is incomplete, as data was missing for 7 minor lists. Radkey's account totals 446,273 votes, including 451 unaccounted votes. Soviet historian L. M. Spirin has the same account for the three major lists, but adds another 25,462 votes for the smaller lists. Spirin's account is used for the results table below.

Estonian List
The Estonian List included ten candidates; four from the Estonian Labour Party and six from the Estonian Social Democratic Association. The list was headed from Hans Piip of the Labour Party.

Results

References

Electoral districts of the Russian Constituent Assembly election, 1917
Saint Petersburg Governorate